Kostyukovka is a rural locality (a selo) and the administrative center of Kostyukovsky Selsoviet of Svobodnensky District, Amur Oblast, Russia. The population was 461 as of 2018. There are 7 streets.

Geography 
Kostyukovka is located on the bank of the Golubaya River, 43 km west of Svobodny (the district's administrative centre) by road. Zigovka is the nearest rural locality.

References 

Rural localities in Svobodnensky District